The State Palaces, Castles and Gardens of Saxony is a state-owned company with its head office in Dresden. It belongs to the Saxon State Ministry of Finance and has the aim of preserving Saxon cultural heritage whilst respecting cultural and conservation needs. The state-owned company manages several palaces, castles and parks in the Saxony. These include the Zwinger in Dresden, the Albrechtsburg in Meissen and Kriebstein Castle.

History 
Following the restoration of the Free State of Saxony on 3 October 1990, assets that had already been owned in the past by the state, or which had been managed during the East German era as legal entities under the Asset Allocation Act, were transferred into the ownership of the new German state.

Starting on the first of January 1992, the state took over the following properties: Dresden Castle including the Johanneum and the Stallhof, the Dresden Zwinger and the Zwinger Gardens, the Japanese Palace with its palace garden, Pillnitz Castle and park, Moritzburg Palace and the surrounding landscape gardens, the Albrechtsburg in Meißen, Königstein Fortress, Schloss Weesenstein, Gnandstein Castle, Frauenstein castle ruins, Großsedlitz Baroque Gardens, Hubertusburg Palace, Nischwitz Palace, Stolpen Castle, Augustusburg Palace, Lichtenwalde Palace, the palace and park at Bad Muskau, Colditz Castle, Altzella Abbey, Nossen Palace, Wiederau Palace, Mildenstein Castle and the Ortenburg

In the following years, other historic buildings were allocated to the Free State of Saxony.

With a cabinet decision on third November 1992, 17 independent state companies were formed for some of the most important sites and placed under commercial management. These companies together formed the State Palaces Department (Staatliche Schlösserverwaltung). During the implementation phase, between 1 April 1993 and 1 January 1994, 15 state-owned enterprises were founded for the following properties:
 1 April 1993: the Albrechtsburg at Meißen, Augustusburg Palace, Scharfenstein Castle, Königstein Fortress, Moritzburg Palace
 1 June 1993: Großsedlitz Baroque Gardens, Gnandstein Castle, Kriebstein Castle, Mildenstein Castle, Rammenau Palace, Stolpen Castle, Weesenstein Palace
 1 August 1993: Dresden State Palaces and Gardens (Staatliche Schlösser und Gärten Dresden) (Pillnitz Palace and park, the Großer Garten, the Brühlsche Terrasse/Zwinger/Stallhof), Nossen Palace/Altzella Abbey Park
 1 January 1994: Rochlitz Palace

In addition, the Palaces Department managed the following properties directly: the Albertinum, the Catholic Court Church, the Jägerhof, the Royal Burial Chapel at Freiberg, Colditz Castle, Lichtenwalde Palace and the Exhibition Hall of the Academy of Art.

The following properties remained under the administration of local authority land offices: the Japanese Palace, Siebeneichen Palace, Reinhardtsgrimma Palace, the Ortenburg, Hubertusburg Palace, Freudenstein Castle, Wurzen Palace, Grimma Palace Königswartha Palace, Suchominsky Villa,  Sonnenstein Castle, Dippoldiswalde Palace, the Niederlauterstein castle ruins, the Frauenstein castle ruins, Wachwitz Palace, the Royal Villa,  Lützschena Palace, Thallwitz Palace, the Grillenburg Hunting Lodge, Brauna Palace, the Keppschloss, Zehren-Schieritz Palace, Königsbrück Palace, Gaussig House, Hohenprießnitz Palace and Ruhenthal Palace. Many of these sites were later transferred to the towns and cities in which they were situated or sold off to third parties.

On 1 March 1996 the Saxon Palaces Department was incorporated into the State Finance Office. On 1 July 2000 the companies running Königstein Fortress on the one hand and the castles of Augustusburg, Lichtenwalde, and Scharfenstein on the other hand were turned in a charitable company. Their owner remains the Free State of Saxony. The management of those involved is carried out by the Palaces Department.

In the period from 1993 to 2003 the Palaces Department's share of the cost rose from 37% to 61.4%. As of 1 January 2003, the Palaces Department was separate from the State Office and a common public enterprise, the "State Palaces, Castles and Gardens of Saxony", was founded. The palace companies are its individual business units.

State Palaces, Castles and Gardens of Saxony

Schlösserland Sachsen 
In 2005, the advertising association Schlösserland Sachsen (Castles of Saxony) was created, a federation of major governmental and non-governmental heritage building and gardens groups, which has the task of preserving, maintaining and displaying Saxony's cultural monuments. Under this umbrella brand, in cooperation with the Saxony Tourism Marketing Corporation (TMGS), more than 50 castles, palaces, gardens, fortresses and castle hotels are marketed both nationwide and internationally.

The following palaces, castles and abbeys are partners in the Werbegemeinschaft Schlösserland Sachsen:

In addition there are the properties owned by the hotel and hospitality industry: Hohnstein Castle, Churfuerstliche Waldschänke Moritzburg, Europa-Jugendherberge Schloss Colditz, Pension Zur Königlichen Ausspanne, Schloss Hotel Dresden-Pillnitz and Schlosshotel Gaußig.

Visitor numbers 
The state-owned palaces, castles and gardens receive about two million visitors every year.

Management and staff 
The head office of the state company has five divisions under the management of Christian Striefler. The individual palace business units are run by a palace manager (Schlossleiter).

The supervisory body for the state firm is the governing board (Verwaltungsrat). Its main task is the oversight of the business leadership and support to the manager.

References

External links 
Official internet site

Public administration
Historic preservation
Government-owned companies of Germany
Companies based in Saxony